The Minnesota State Elections were held on November 7, 2006, seats were up for election for both the Minnesota House of Representatives and the Minnesota Senate as well as the race for Governor of Minnesota, Minnesota Attorney General, Minnesota Secretary of State, and Minnesota State Auditor.

Overview 
The 2006 elections saw all 134 seats in the State House, elected to 2-year terms, and all 67 seats in the State Senate, elected to 4-year terms, up for election.  Incumbent Republican Governor Tim Pawlenty ran for a second term with opposition coming from Democratic-Farmer-Labor Attorney General Mike Hatch.  Republican Secretary of State Mary Kiffmeyer saw opposition from DFLer Mark Ritchie, and Republican Auditor Patricia Anderson was challenged by DFLer Rebecca Otto.

House elections 
Since 1998 the Republicans held a majority in the House of Representatives which, since the 2004 elections, had been reduced to a slim 68-66.  In 2006 the DFL gained 19 seats to give them an 85-49 majority.

!style="background-color:#E9E9E9;text-align:left;" width=400 10em" colspan="2" rowspan="2" | Party
!style="background-color:#E9E9E9;text-align:right;" colspan="4" | Seats
!style="background-color:#E9E9E9;text-align:right;" colspan="3" | Popular Vote
|-
! style="background-color:#E9E9E9;text-align:right;" | 2004
! style="background-color:#E9E9E9;text-align:right;" | 2006
! style="background-color:#E9E9E9;text-align:right;" | +/− 
! style="background-color:#E9E9E9;text-align:right;" | %
! style="background-color:#E9E9E9;text-align:right;" | Vote
! style="background-color:#E9E9E9;text-align:right;" | %
! style="background-color:#E9E9E9;text-align:right;" | +/−
|-
| style="background-color: #0000ff; width: 5px" |
| style="text-align: left" | Democratic–Farmer–Labor Party
| 66
| 85
| +19
| 64%
| 
| 
| 
|-
| style="background-color: #ff0000; width: 5px" |
| style="text-align: left" | Republican Party
| 68
| 49
| −19
| 36%
| 
| 
| 
|-
| style="background-color: #ffffff; width: 5px" |
| style="text-align: left" | Independence Party
| 0
| 0
| 0
| 0
| 
| 
| 
|-
| style="background-color: #000000; width: 5px" |
| style="text-align: left" | Others
| 0
| 0
| 0
| 0
| 
| 
| 
|-
| style="background-color: #f2f2f2; text-align: left; font-weight: bold" colspan="2" | Total
| style="background-color: #f2f2f2; font-weight: bold" | 134
| style="background-color: #f2f2f2; font-weight: bold" | 134
| style="background-color: #f2f2f2; font-weight: bold" | 0
| style="background-color: #f2f2f2; font-weight: bold" | 100.0%
| style="background-color: #f2f2f2; font-weight: bold" | 2,217,552
| style="background-color: #f2f2f2; font-weight: bold" | 100.0%
| style="background-color: #f2f2f2; font-weight: bold" | 0
|-
!style=text-align:left colspan=10|Voter turnout:   59.5 %
|-
|}

References

 
Minnesota